Zak Kadison is an American film producer best known for his work on the films Blood Creek, My Sassy Girl and Whisper. For a number of years he was a vice president of production for Fox Atomic before leaving to found Blacklight Transmedia with R. Eric Lieb, Mark Long and Joanna Alexander.

Filmography

Film
Blood Creek (2009) (co-producer)
My Sassy Girl (2008) (co-producer)
Whisper (2007) (producer)

Television
Beyond (2016) (executive Producer, pilot)

References

External links

American film producers
Year of birth missing (living people)
Living people